The National Dance Company of Korea is the national dance company of South Korea.

Affiliation 
The dance company has been affiliated with National Theater of Korea located in the neighborhood of Jangchung-dong, Jung-gu, central of Seoul where the National Dance Company of Korea mainly has performed as well as the National Theater Company of Korea, the National Changguk Company Of Korea and the National Orchestra Company of Korea.

History and Work 
National Dance Company of Korea was established by the director, Im Seong-nam (임성남) and 12 other dancers in February 1962. Since then, it has been a representative dance company in South Korea with the purpose to create new dances based on Korean traditional dance and to perform the works.
By participating in various international festivals, National Dance Company has presented the world, its rich repertoire.
From October 2006 to April 2007  Soul, Sunflower, the dance production of National Dance Company and the German Musical group Saltacello (Peter Schindler) has been several sold-out appearances in Seoul. This production is a unique cultural cooperation between Germany and Korea and re-create the Korean dance Salpuri with a modern interpretation.
Nearly since fifty years, the National Dance Company of Korea has expressed the feeling of Korean humans and the aesthetic appeal of Korean culture in dance performances.

Gallery

See also

List of dance companies
Korean dance
The National Center for Korean Traditional Performing Arts
Changgeuk

References

External links

 website

Dance companies in South Korea